Äng is a locality situated in Nässjö Municipality, Jönköping County, Sweden with 277 inhabitants in 2010.

References 

Populated places in Jönköping County
Populated places in Nässjö Municipality